Cartas para una víctima is a Mexican telenovela produced by Ernesto Alonso for Televisa in 1978.

Cast 
Julissa
José Alonso
Frank Moro
Miguel Manzano
Sergio Jimenez
Miguel Gómez Checa
Liliana Abud

References

External links 

Mexican telenovelas
1978 telenovelas
Televisa telenovelas
Spanish-language telenovelas
1978 Mexican television series debuts
1978 Mexican television series endings